Khairpur or Khayrpur may refer to:

 Khairpur, a city in Sindh, Pakistan
 Khairpur District, which has Khairpur city as its capital
 Khairpur (princely state), a former princely state of Pakistan and British India, abolished in 1955
 Khairpur, Badin, a village in Sindh, Pakistan
 Khairpur village, Chakwal District

fr:Khayrpur